Hypsopygia is a genus of moths belonging to the family Pyralidae. Though fairly small, they are large among their relatives. It was described by Jacob Hübner in 1825.

Taxonomy
The genera Herculia, Dolichomia, Pseudasopia, Orthopygia and Ocrasa are mostly merged into Hypsopygia, although some authors still treat them as distinct genera.

Species
Species include:
 Hypsopygia acerasta (Turner, 1904)
 Hypsopygia albidalis (Walker, 1866)
 Hypsopygia albilunalis (Caradja, 1927)
 Hypsopygia albolinealis (Hampson, 1891)
 Hypsopygia alluaudalis Leraut, 2006
 Hypsopygia almanalis (Rebel, 1917)
 Hypsopygia ambrensis Leraut, 2006
 Hypsopygia amoenalis (Möschler, 1882)
 Hypsopygia angulifascialis (Caradja, 1932)
 Hypsopygia audeoudi (de Joannis, 1927)
 Hypsopygia bamakoensis Leraut, 2006
 Hypsopygia biarealis (Caradja, 1925)
 Hypsopygia bilinealis (South, 1901)
 Hypsopygia binodulalis (Zeller, 1872)
 Hypsopygia bistonalis (Walker, 1859)
 Hypsopygia boudinoti Leraut, 2006
 Hypsopygia caesalis (Zeller, 1852)
 Hypsopygia camerounalis Leraut, 2006
 Hypsopygia castanealis (Shibuya, 1928)
 Hypsopygia castaneorufa (Hampson, 1917)
 Hypsopygia chytriodes (Turner, 1911)
 Hypsopygia cineralis (de Joannis, 1927)
 Hypsopygia cohortalis (Grote, 1878)
 Hypsopygia costaeguttalis Caradja, 1933
 Hypsopygia costalis (Fabricius, 1775) – gold triangle
 Hypsopygia craspedalis (Hampson, 1906)
 Hypsopygia datames (Druce, 1900)
 Hypsopygia decetialis (Druce, 1900)
 Hypsopygia decoloralis (Lederer, 1863)
 Hypsopygia dharmsalae (Butler, 1889)
 Hypsopygia drabicilialis (Yamanaka, 1968)
 Hypsopygia ecbrunnealis (Hampson, 1917)
 Hypsopygia ecrhodalis (Hampson, 1917)
 Hypsopygia flammealis (Hampson, 1906)
 Hypsopygia flavamaculata Shaffer, Nielsen & Horak, 1996 – formerly H. laticilialis Rothschild, 1916 (non Ragonot, 1916: preoccupied)
 Hypsopygia flavirufalis (Hampson, 1917)
 Hypsopygia fulvocilialis (Duponchel, 1834)
 Hypsopygia fuscalis (Hampson, 1891)
 Hypsopygia glaucinalis (Linnaeus, 1758)
 Hypsopygia graafialis (Snellen, 1975)
 Hypsopygia griseobrunnea (Hampson, 1917)
 Hypsopygia griveaudalis Leraut, 2006
 Hypsopygia haemograpta (Meyrick, 1934)
 Hypsopygia hoenei (Caradja, 1932)
 Hypsopygia ignefimbrialis (Hampson, 1906)
 Hypsopygia igniflualis (Walker, 1859)
 Hypsopygia impurpuratalis (Dognin, 1910)
 Hypsopygia incarnatalis (Zeller, 1847)
 Hypsopygia intermedialis (Walker, 1862)
 Hypsopygia iwamotoi Kirpichnikova & Yamanaka, 1995
 Hypsopygia jezoensis (Shibuya, 1928)
 Hypsopygia joannisalis Leraut, 2006
 Hypsopygia kawabei Yamanaka, 1965
 Hypsopygia lacteocilia (Hampson, 1917)
 Hypsopygia mabokealis Leraut, 2006
 Hypsopygia maesalis Leraut, 2006
 Hypsopygia marthalis (Walker, 1859)
 Hypsopygia mauritialis (Boisduval, 1833)
 Hypsopygia medialis (Hampson, 1903)
 Hypsopygia melanthalis (Walker, 1859)
 Hypsopygia meridocrossa (Meyrick, 1934)
 Hypsopygia metayei Leraut, 2006
 Hypsopygia moramangalis (Marion & Viette, 1956)
 Hypsopygia murzinalis Leraut, 2006
 Hypsopygia mus (Caradja, 1932)
 Hypsopygia nannodes (Butler, 1879)
 Hypsopygia nigrapuncta (Kaye, 1901)
 Hypsopygia nigrivitta (Walker, 1863)
 Hypsopygia nitidicilialis (Hering, 1901)
 Hypsopygia nonusalis (Walker, 1859)
 Hypsopygia nossibealis Leraut, 2006
 Hypsopygia nostralis (Guenée, 1854)
 Hypsopygia ochreicilia (Hampson, 1891)
 Hypsopygia olapalis Viette, 1978
 Hypsopygia olinalis (Guenée, 1854)
 Hypsopygia orthogramma (Inoue, 1960)
 Hypsopygia pelasgalis (Walker, 1859)
 Hypsopygia pernigralis (Ragonot, 1891)
 Hypsopygia perpulverea (Hampson, 1917)
 Hypsopygia phanerostola (Hampson, 1917)
 Hypsopygia phoezalis (Dyar, 1908)
 Hypsopygia placens (Butler, 1879)
 Hypsopygia planalis (Grote, 1880)
 Hypsopygia plumbeoprunalis (Hampson, 1917)
 Hypsopygia postflava (Hampson, 1893)
 Hypsopygia proboscidalis (Strand, 1919)
 Hypsopygia purpureorufa (Hampson, 1917 )
 Hypsopygia pyrerythra (Hampson, 1917)
 Hypsopygia racilialis (Walker, 1859)
 Hypsopygia regina (Butler, 1879)
 Hypsopygia repetita (Butler, 1887)
 Hypsopygia resectalis (Lederer, 1863)
 Hypsopygia roseotincta (Hampson, 1917)
 Hypsopygia rubidalis (Denis & Schiffermüller, 1775)
 Hypsopygia rudis (Moore, 1888)
 Hypsopygia sericea (Warren, 1891)
 Hypsopygia suffusalis (Walker, 1866)
 Hypsopygia superba Caradja, 1934
 Hypsopygia tabidalis (Warren 1891)
 Hypsopygia taiwanalis (Shibuya, 1928)
 Hypsopygia thyellodes (Meyrick, 1934)
 Hypsopygia thymetusalis (Walker, 1859)
 Hypsopygia tripartitalis (Herrich-Schäffer, 1871)
 Hypsopygia tristalis (Hampson, 1906)
 Hypsopygia vernaculalis (Berg, 1874)
 Hypsopygia violaceomarginalis (Caradja, 1935)
 Hypsopygia vulgaris (Ghesquière, 1942)

Footnotes

References

Pyralini
Pyralidae genera